The 2015–16 Clemson Tigers women's basketball team will represent Clemson University during the 2015–16 college basketball season. The Tigers, are led by third year head coach Audra Smith. The Tigers, members of the Atlantic Coast Conference, will play their home games at Jervey Athletic Center due to renovations at Littlejohn Coliseum. They finished the season 4–26, 0–16 in ACC play to finish in last place. They lost in the first round of ACC women's tournament to Wake Forest.

Roster

Schedule

|-
!colspan=9 style="background:#522D80; color:#F66733;"| Exhibition

|-
!colspan=9 style="background:#522D80; color:#F66733;"| Non-conference regular season

|-
!colspan=9 style="background:#522D80; color:#F66733;"| ACC regular season

|-
!colspan=9 style="background:#522D80; color:#F66733;"| ACC Women's Tournament

Rankings
2015–16 NCAA Division I women's basketball rankings

See also
 2015–16 Clemson Tigers men's basketball team

References

Clemson Tigers women's basketball seasons
Clemson
Clemson Tig
Clemson Tig